Niklas Hjulström (born 15 February 1962) is a Swedish actor, singer and director. He is brother to Carin Hjulström, grandson to Filip Hjulström and son to Lennart Hjulström.

Hjulström was born  in Mölndal, Sweden, and finished his education in 1990 at NAMA in Stockholm. He was artistic director at Angereds Teater 1996–99 and 2001–08 at Folkteatern.

As singer, Hjulström is member in the pop duo Cue.

Selected direction
2002–04 – Simon and the Oaks (Folkteatern)
2008 – Tre kärlekar (Folkteatern)

Selected filmography
 1992 – Svart Lucia
 1993 – Roseanna
 1993 – Brandbilen som försvann
 1993 – Polis polis potatismos!
 1993 – Mannen på balkongen
 1994 – Stockholm Marathon
 1994 – Tre kronor
 2001 – Deadline
 2003 – Paradiset
 2003 – De drabbade
 2003 – Swedenhielms
 2005 – Orka! Orka!
 2007 – Isprinsessan
 2007 – Predikanten
 2009 – The Girl Who Kicked the Hornets' Nest
 2009 – Stenhuggaren
 2010 – Olycksfågeln

References

External links

1962 births
Living people
Swedish male actors
Swedish film directors
Swedish male singers